Flambards Theme Park is an amusement park on the southern outskirts of the town of Helston in Cornwall, England, United Kingdom. It was founded in 1976 as the Cornwall Aero Park by Douglas Kingsford Hale MBE.

History

Flambards first opened in 1976 under the name of 'Cornwall Aero Park'. Owned by Douglas Kingsford Hale MBE, the park slowly built up an array of aircraft, models and exhibitions.

In 1984, "Britain in the Blitz," a mock-up of a bomb-hit street during World War II, was opened.

By 1990, the park had grown and was renamed "The Flambards Experience." Early rides featured at the theme park included the Dragon Coaster, the Canyon River Log Flume, Paddle Boats, and the hype glide.

For the 2007 season, three rides were added: The Rocking Tug, The Carousel, and The Space Shuttle.

For the 2008 season, the Cornish Mine Train ride was added and the  War of the Worlds paintball game was introduced. 2009 saw no major additions to the park, however the field housing the helipad was sold late in the season. The museum exhibitions are open year-round, but the rides and play areas are open seasonally.

In 2010, the Skyraker 001 opened and claimed the title of the UK's first twisting drop tower. As well as this addition, the Park was renamed to Flambards Theme Park.

On 6 December 2013, the park was bought by Livingston Leisure Ltd, an investor in the Park.

In 2015, Livingston Leisure opened a new ride called the 'Sky Swinger', added screens fronted to like a picture frame to the Victorian Village, and is continuing to make improvements to the Park which will have been open for 40 years in 2016.

In March 2016, Jurassic Journey, a permanent exhibition where visitors can follow in the footsteps of dinosaurs, opened at the Park.

March 2017 brought the announcement of further investment in the form of a new HUSS Frisbee Ride, transported from the defunct Pleasure Island park in Lincolnshire, and renamed as Sky-Force to fit in with the current Sky High thrill rides promotion. The ride took the former place of the Ladybird Coin Operated Boats, Coin Operated Trucks and Kids pirate-themed play area and climbing frame.

The winter of 2017-2018 saw an improvement in current facilities and a major redecoration, which has led to a much cleaner and brighter feel for the 2018 season.

The 2018-2019 Winter closure, saw minor renovations around the park, including the redecoration of some of the indoor exhibits. It also saw the addition of a coin-operated, ‘Faulty Repair Shop’ shooting gallery, manufactured by Pan Amusements. The unit is located next to the entrance of the indoor attractions. Access to the Avro Shackleton cockpit was also removed, over radiation fears.

The winter of 2019-2020 saw minor improvements around the park. These included the removal of trees around the Hornet Coaster, a new canopy on the Carousel, and improvements to park and ride lighting.

Due to the COVID-19 pandemic, Flambards Theme Park was closed for a brief period of time in early 2020. The site was reopened in July of the same year after government guidance was changed.

The park was forced to close for a brief period, at the beginning of the 2021 season, fully reopening in May. A new ride was announced prior to opening, ‘The Western Mine Train,’ and officially opened on 26 May 2021. Other work that took place over the 2020-2021 Winter season included the demolition of the Indoor Stage and ‘Kingsford Hale’ Bar. This has now been replaced with an outdoor seating area. The Victorian village had a partial replacement of lighting, with the introduction of LED bulbs in certain areas. Minor repairs have been made in ‘Britain in the Blitz,’ further improving the exhibition. The outdoor play area has also had a completely new set of play equipment.

The 2021-2022 Winter closure saw lots of redecoration around the park, including areas that had not been touched for several years. The Village cafe was completely revamped, with new seating, and a repaint. The Science Exploratorium was demolished, and replaced with an outdoor seating area. Additionally, the former Remote Controlled Pirate Ship area has been demolished and reverted to a pond. Trees around ‘Ferdi’s Funland’ have been removed, and the Miniature Pirate Ship in this area has been replaced with a Miniature Carousel.

Attractions

The Big Ride Zone

Jurassic Journey
Life-size dinosaurs include a 5-metre tall brachiosaurus, a T-Rex and a triceratops. There is also a "Dino-Nursery" including baby velociraptors and a "Dino-dig" – where children can unearth fossilised remains of a prehistoric boneyard.

Ferdi's Funland
An area at Flambards is devoted to younger guests.

 Human Cannonball – As you spin, control your height as you fly in 4-person capsules.
 Mini Carousel – A miniature version of the traditional carousel.
 Tea Cups – A miniature version of a tea cups ride.
 Dino Express – Travel through a Dinosaur Haven in Dinosaur-themed cars.
 Space Shuttle – Control your capsule and you travel up and down the tower.
 The Cornish Children's Eye – A miniature version of a classic Ferris wheel.
 The Western Mine Train - a short train ride, through a Western Mining Town. (Located near to the outdoor stage, next to ‘Balloon Race’.)
 Outdoor Stage - Live entertainment stage

Exhibitions

 The Victorian Village Experience – The Victorian Village was created of just three rooms in 1979 by Mrs. Audrey Kingsford – Hale who wanted to portray a life-size recreation of the fascinating Victorian period. Through the years the village has grown to some 50 shops, cottages and attendant trades including a butcher’s shop, bakery, blacksmiths and sweet shop. A time capsule is also available to view showing the history of William Whites Chemist Shop.

 The Britain in the Blitz Experience – The Britain in the Blitz exhibition was opened in 1984 by Dame Vera Lynn.
 The War Gallery – The War Gallery is closely linked with the Britain In The Blitz exhibition, and is a tribute to all of the men and women of Great Britain and The Commonwealth who served in World Wars 1 and 2.
 Memory Lane – Charts a century of Wedding Gowns from Mid Victorian to the 1970s including a War Time dress made from a parachute. The stitch marks of the seams show that it was re-fitted and worn by several brides. The selection of photographs also charts weddings from the late Victorian period.
 The Aviation Experience - A Century of Pioneering Flight is an inter-active exhibition of some highlights in aviation history throughout the last Century. It features the achievements of:
Richard Pearse, the son of Cornish parents settled in New Zealand, claimed by some to have made the first sustained powered flight in 1902, a year ahead of the American Wright Brothers.
Charles Kingsford Smith, who in 1929 piloted the a flight between Australia and England.
The full-scale flight deck of Concorde, built by BAC for defining and confirming the ultimate positioning of the highly complex instrumentation, plus flight crew and passenger seating.
 Operation Sealion - an insight into the German intelligence gathering in preparation for the planned Nazi invasion of England in World War 2.
 William White’s Chemist Time Capsule - Discovered after being locked away and forgotten since 1909 in South Petherton, Somerset. Every item in the shop was numbered and charted so that when it was re-assembled at Flambards everything was exactly the same as the original.

Family Entertainment

 Space Orbiters (Coin Operated Bumper Cars)
 ‘Faulty Repair Shop’ Shooting Range (Coin Operated Shooting Gallery)
 ‘Harley’s Angels’ (Coin Operated Ride on Motorcycles)
 Coin Operated Crane Machines
 Family Amusements
 Free to Play Mini Golf (9 hole golf course)

Former Attractions

 Extreme Force - a Ranger pendulum ride, built by UK manufacturer K.T. Enterprises. - Currently in storage. Operated between 2002, and 2013. 
 Paddle boats - opened during the late 1980’s and removed early 2000’s. 
 Dragon Ride - a Zamperla Rollercoaster located at the park between 1990, and 1994. 
 Hype glide - a giant slide, manufactured by Harry Steer in 1980s. Scrapped in 2001.
 Space Mission - Três Eixos Caterpillar Coaster. Opened in 1991, and removed in early 2000s. 
 Cornish Mine Train - opened 2008, and closed in 2012, following the construction of neighboring attraction, One2Eleven.
 War of the Worlds - a paintball game operating during the 2008 season. 
 Gus Honeybun’s underground burrow, and garden - replaced in Jurassic Journey in mid 2010’s. 
 Coin Operated Fork Lifts - Removed in early 2010’s. 
 Ladybird Boats - Toddler Self Drive, Coin Operated Boats. Removed in 2017, and replaced by SkyForce.
 Coin Operated Radio Controlled Trucks - Removed in 2017, and replaced by SkyForce.
 Pirate themed outdoor play area and climbing frame - Removed in 2017, and replaced by SkyForce.
 Indoor Stage, and ‘Kingsford Hale’ Bar - Demolished Winter 2020/21, and replaced with an outdoor seating area. 
 The Pirate Ship - Miniature version located in ‘Ferdi’s Funland’ - Replaced by Mini Carousel over Winter 2021/22. 
 Science Exploratorium (Also known as Hands on Science) - Demolished 2021/22. 
 Remote Controlled Pirate Ships - Removed 2021/22, pond retained as nature area.

Opened, and Closed dates are unknown for the following attractions. 
 Superbob
 SR2 Simulator
 Gravitron
 SuperCinema 3D
 Space Rangers
 AquaBuggies

Food and Drink

Flambards has two main eateries within the park.

 Village Cafe
 Ferdi’s Burger Bar

There are also many takeaway outlets located around the park. These serve a range of hot and cold drinks, snacks, and ice creams.

References

External links 

Amusement parks in England
Entertainment in Cornwall
Tourist attractions in Cornwall
Aerospace museums in England
Gardens in Cornwall
Museums in Cornwall
History museums in Cornwall
1976 establishments in England